Charles John Michael Kenny (19 May 1929 – 9 September 1996) was an English cricketer active from 1950 to 1962 who played for Cambridge University and Essex. He was born in Wallington, Surrey and died in Chiddingfold. He appeared in 40 first-class matches as a righthanded batsman who bowled right arm fast medium. He scored 75 runs with a highest score of 16 and took 117 wickets with a best performance of seven for 45.

Notes

1929 births
1996 deaths
English cricketers
Essex cricketers
Ireland cricketers
Cambridge University cricketers
Free Foresters cricketers
People educated at Ampleforth College
Cricketers from Yorkshire